Kamou Malo (born 1963) is a Burkinabé former footballer who is currently manager of Burkina Faso.

Biography 
Kamou Malo is a police officer by profession. While working in Ouagadougou Malo, he rose to the rank of police captain and at the same time coached the police football team. He got the opportunity to go to Germany to start training as a coach and give up his career as an official.

Playing career
During his playing career, Malo played for Ouagadougou-based clubs US Ouagadougou and Étoile Filante.

Managerial career
In 2010, after managing Majestic, Malo was appointed manager of RC Kadiogo. After a three-year period, Malo joined AS SONABEL. In 2015, Malo returned to Kadiogo. During his second spell at the club, Malo helped Kadiogo to win two Burkinabé Premier League's, in 2016 and 2017. In 2018, Malo joined USFA, finishing second in the league. 

In July 2019, Malo was appointed manager of Burkina Faso. In the role of head coach of Burkina Faso he take the fourth place in 2021 Africa Cup of Nations but the Burkina Faso Football Federation decided not to renew the contract which expired in February 2022.

Personal life
Malo's son, Patrick, is a current Burkina Faso international.

Honours
RC Kadiogo

Burkinabé Premier League: 2015–16, 2016–17

 Coupe du Faso: 2012

 Burkinabé SuperCup: 2012

References

Living people
Association football midfielders
Burkinabé footballers
Burkinabé football managers
Burkina Faso national football team managers
1963 births
US Ouagadougou players
Étoile Filante de Ouagadougou players
21st-century Burkinabé people